The 2023 network television schedule for the seven major commercial broadcast networks in Argentina covers from January to December 2023. The schedule is followed by a list per network of returning series, new series, and series canceled after the 2022 television season.

Telefe was the first to announce its summer schedule on 2 November 2022, followed by Net TV on 22 November, El Trece on 7 December, América on 29 December, and Televisión Pública on 2 January 2023. El Nueve and Bravo TV did not publicly announce their schedules.

Local schedules may differ, as affiliates have the option to pre-empt or delay network programs. Such scheduling may be limited to preemptions caused by local or national breaking news and any major sports events scheduled to air in a weekday timeslot. Stations may air shows at other times at their preference and/or replace the network's news programming with local newscasts.

Bravo TV is not included on Saturdays and Sundays since the network's schedules feature reruns only.

Legend

Weekday schedule

 New series are highlighted in bold.
 All times are in Argentina time (UTC -3:00).

Early morning

Late morning

Early afternoon

Late afternoon
 

Note: Mi Fortuna es Amarte premiered on El Trece on 9 January 2023 at 5:00 p.m. and was removed from the schedule after airing for one week.

Primetime (Monday–Thrusday)

Primetime (Friday)

Late night

Saturday schedule

 New series are highlighted in bold.
 All times are in Argentina time (UTC -3:00).
 Beginning 28 January 2023, and throughout the 2023 Men's and Women's First Division, and Men's Torneo Federal A football seasons, Televisión Pública programming may be preempted in favor of the games under Fútbol ATP.

Early morning

Note: América and Net TV are not included since the networks' schedules feature reruns and infomercials only. El Trece is not included as it does not offer any type of programming during the early morning block.

Late morning

Early afternoon

Late afternoon

Primetime

Late night

Sunday schedule

 New series are highlighted in bold.
 All times are in Argentina time (UTC -3:00).
 Beginning 29 January 2023, and throughout the 2023 Men's and Women's First Division, and Men's Torneo Federal A football seasons, Televisión Pública programming may be preempted in favor of the games under Fútbol ATP.

Early morning

Note: América and Net TV are not included since the networks' schedules feature reruns and infomercials only. El Trece is not included as it does not offer any type of programming during the early morning block.

Late morning

Note: Net TV is not included since the network's schedule features reruns and infomercials only.

Early afternoon

Late afternoon

Primetime

Late night

By network

América

Returning series:
A la Tarde
The A-Team 
Animérica
Ambiente y Medio
América Noticias
América Top Ten
BDA Extra
Buenos Días América
Cámaras de Seguridad
Chicas Guapas
Desayuno Americano 
Dr. C 
Drivers
EPA!
Es Domingo: Estamos a Tiempo
Fitness y Belleza
Franquicias que Crecen
GPS
Intrusos
Knight Rider 
LAM
LPA
Los Mammones 
Modo Foodie
Modo Selfie
Pasión de Sábado
Secretos Verdaderos
Tecno Tendencias

New series:
Invasores de la TV
Noche al Dente

Not returning from 2022:
América Noticias Mediodía
Animales Sueltos
Recreo, el Programa

Bravo TV

Returning series:
Avenida Brasil  
Las Bravas
Bravo Argentina
Bravo por Este Día
Bravo Nius
Destilando Amor 
Enfermeras
Esmeralda 
Her Mother's Killer
Los Herederos del Monte 
Iubire şi Onoare 
Primera Dama 

Not returning from 2022:
A Força do Querer

Net TV

Returning series:
Alma Gaucha
Bayly
Editando Tele
Entrometidos en la Tarde
Festival de Jesús María 
Fiestas Argentinas
Full Face TV
Gossip
Imagen de Moda
Máxima Velocidad
Modo Fontevecchia
Pablo Escobar: El Patrón del Mal 
Pares de Comedia
Periodismo Puro
Personalmente
Primera Vuelta
The Queen of Flow
RePerfilAr
Resumen de Noticias
Rosario Tijeras
El Señor de los Cielos
Toda la Vida
La Usurpadora 
Y Ahora Quién Podrá Ayudarnos?

New series:
Viva el Carnaval
The White Slave

Not returning from 2022:
Buen Plan
La Cocina del Mundial
Como Todo
Como Todo Express
Escuela para Maridos
La Hora de Francisco
Império 
Mi Gorda Bella 
Pedro, el Escamoso 
La Piloto
Las Rubias
Tal Cual
Tarde de Chicas
Tierra Indomable

El Nueve

Returning series:
Algo que Contar
Argentina x Argentinos
Automás
Bendita
Claves para un Mundo Mejor
La Cocina de los Calamaro
La Cocina del 9 
Comer para Creer
Con Estilo
Conexión Jubilados
Clave Argentina
Crimen y Misterio
La Divina Noche de Dante
En Estéreo
Flechazo: Amor Oculto
La Hora Exacta
Implacables
Jineteando
Nara que Ver
Opinión Pública
El Planeta Urbano
Prevenir
Puente Musical
Qué Mañana!
El Show del Problema
La Tarde del Nueve
Telenueve
Amanece
Informes Telenueve
Telenueve al Amanecer
Telenueve al Cierre
Telenueve al Mediodía
Telenueve Central
Todas las Tardes
Vivo para Vos

New series:
Alumnitos
Médico de Familia

Not returning from 2022:
Está en tus Manos
Moria es Moria
Opinión Pública
Selección Argentina, la Serie
Selección de Noticias, Camino a Qatar
El Sueño de tu Casa Propia
Super Super

Telefe

Returning series:
#TT: Tiempo y Tránsito
A la Barbarossa
Ariel en su Salsa
Bizim Hikaye
Buen Telefe
Casados con Hijos 
Código Viaje
Copa Libertadores 
Cortá por Lozano
Expedición Robinson 
Got Talent Argentina 
Finde en Nick
Gran Hermano
Gravedad Zero
İstanbullu Gelin
MasterChef Argentina 
Nick Jr.
El Noticiero de la Gente
Pasapalabra
La Peña de Morfi
PH: Podemos Hablar
Pluto TV Presenta: Espiando la Casa
Ruta del Vino
The Simpsons 
Staff
Telefe Noticias

New series:
The Challenge Argentina: El Desafío
Pantanal
Sen Çal Kapımı

Not returning from 2022:
Bir Zamanlar Çukurova
Gênesis
Por el Mundo Mundial
¿Quién es la Máscara?
La Voz Argentina

Televisión Pública

Returning series:
Altavoz
Archivo General de la Emoción
El Cálamo y su Mensaje
Caminos de Tiza
Carreras Argentinas
Cocineras y Cocineros Argentinos
Desde la Vida
Desiguales
Documentales en TVP
Dos20
Ejército Argentino
Encuentro en el Estudio 
El Festival del Bien Público
Función Federal
Fútbol ATP
La Liga de la Ciencia
Madres de la Plaza
Mañanas Públicas
Música por la Ciencia
Noche de Mente
Otra Trama
País Federal
Pakapaka
Pampero TV
¿Quién Sabe Más de Argentina?
La Santa Misa
Ser Esencial
Shalom AMIA
Los Siete Locos
Televisión Pública Noticias
Televisión Pública Noticias Internacional
Todos Estamos Conectados
Unísono, la Música va a tu Casa

New series:
Aire Nacional
Festival País '23
La Previa de Festival País '23
Zona Mixta

Not returning from 2022:
Festival de Jesús María 
Mundo Leo
La Noche del Mundial
La Tarde del Mundial

El Trece

Returning series:
Los 8 Escalones
Argentina, Tierra de Amor y Venganza 
Arriba Argentinos
Bienvenidos a Bordo
Canta Conmigo Ahora
Carburando
Cucinare
El Garage
El Hotel de los Famosos
La Noche de Mirtha
Mediodía Noticias
Nosotros a la Mañana
Panam y Circo
Pasión por el Fútbol
Piñón en Familia
Plan TV
Síntesis
Socios del Espectáculo
Tiempo del Tiempo
Telenoche
Zorro 

New series:
Canım Annem
¿De Qué Signo Sos?
Los Desconocidos de Siempre
Mi Fortuna es Amarte

Not returning from 2022:
La 1-5/18
100 Argentinos Dicen
Hogar Dulce Hogar
Momento D

Renewals and cancellations

Renewals

América

Bravo TV

Net TV

El Nueve

Telefe
Copa Libertadores—Renewed through the 2026 season.

Televisión Pública

El Trece

Cancellations/series endings

América
Dr. C—It was announced on 24 February 2023 that the show would move to C5N since 4 March 2023.
EPA!—Canceled on 17 March 2023.
LPA—Canceled on 26 January 2023.

Bravo TV

Net TV

El Nueve

Telefe

Televisión Pública

El Trece
Mi Fortuna es Amarte—Pulled from the schedule and canceled on 13 January 2023.

Weekly top rated programs

The table below lists television shows in Argentina with the highest average household rating for each week. Audience averages are measured only in the Greater Buenos Aires area, according to data from Kantar Ibope Media.

See also
Television in Argentina
List of television stations in Argentina

Notes

References

Television in Argentina
2023 in Argentine television